The  is a group of Kofun period burial mounds located in the Takarazuka neighborhood of the city of Matsusaka,  Mie Prefecture  in the Kansai region of Japan. It was designated a National Historic Site of Japan in 1932.

Overview
The Takarazuka Kofun are located on low hills on the right bank of the Sakanai River, approximately three kilometers to the south of the center of the city of Matsusaka. The site was first excavated in 1928 by a team from Mie University under the direction of Dr Toshio Sato, and was found to be part of a larger cluster of at least 88 kofun, of which 26 were relatively intact. However, by 1965 encroaching urban development had destroyed 81 of the kofun, and a movement was begun to preserve the remaining seven. However, in the twenty years it took to obtain official injunctions against further destruction and urban development, another three of the remaining kofun were destroyed. Despite the area official protection being extended in 1978, a road was built directly through the site in the 1980s, destroying another two of the remaining four kofun, and physically separating the remaining pair. The two surviving tumuli were excavated from 1998 to 2003 by the Matsusaka City Board of Education. Since 2005, the tumuli have been part of the

Takarazuka Kofun No.1
It is the largest found in Ise Province and the 4th largest in Mie Prefecture. It is estimated to have been built in the middle of the Kofun period in the early 5th century AD. Both fukiishi and haniwa have been found in profusion on the tumulus. The tumulus has a small rectangular stage extending from one side, presumably for ceremonial purposes. When it was re-evcavated by the Mie Prefectural Board of Education from 1999-2000, and numerous haniwa and other funerary objects were uncovered. These, as well as the artifacts uncovered in the 1928 excavations, are preserved at the Matsusaka City Cultural Center. Of especial note is a large boat-shaped haniwa, as well as haniwa in the shapes of single and multistory houses, and of men in armor. In 2006, these artifacts were collectively designated an National Important Cultural Property. 

The details of the burial chamber, as the interior of the tumulus has not been excavated. Ground penetrating radar surveys indicate that a chamber with a length of approximately seven meters in a north-south alignment exists about 1.2 meters below the surface of the posterior circular portion; however, as the boat-shaped haniwa was found on the anterior portion of the tumulus, it is most probable that the tumulus contains multiple burial chambers in both sections. The  boat-shaped haniwa was found in a niche created by breaking the fukiishi covering of the tumulus, indicating that it was placed at some point after the tumulus had been completed.

Overall length 111 meters
Posterior circular portion 75 meter diameter x 10 meters high x 3 tiers
Anterior rectangular portion 66 meters wide x 8.1 meters high x 3 tiers

Takarazuka Kofun No.2
It has an overall length of 90 meters and is orientated to the south-southwest. The posterior circular portion is constructed in three tiers, and the anterior rectangular portion in two-tiers; however, the eastern corner has been partially destroyed due to road construction, despite its official protected status. As with Kofun No.1, fukiishi and numerous haniwa have been uncovered. The details of burial chamber are unknown, as the tumulus has not yet been excavated, but from the structure and haniwa, it is estimated to date from the early 5th century AD. 

Overall length 90 meters
Posterior circular portion 83 meter diameter x 10.5 meters high x 3 tiers
Anterior rectangular portion 40 meters wide x 17 meters long x 2.9 meters high x 2 tiers

Comparing the two tumuli, although the hotategaigata-kofun is usually considered inferior to the zenpō-kōen-fun in terms of status, the Takarazuka Kofun No.2  is larger than Takarazuka Kofun No.1, in terms of the diameter and height of the posterior circular portion, despite its shorter length.

Gallery

See also
List of Historic Sites of Japan (Mie)

References

External links

Report on excavations with photos 
Matsusaka City Cultural Center home page 
Matsusaka City Hall home page 
Mie Prefecture Board of Education 

Kofun
Archaeological sites in Japan
History of Mie Prefecture
Matsusaka, Mie
Historic Sites of Japan